Parça Xələc (also, Khaladzh and Parchakhaladzh) is a village and municipality in the Salyan Rayon of Azerbaijan.  It has a population of 1,440.

References 

Populated places in Salyan District (Azerbaijan)